Ekparakwa is a town and as well one among the nine clans located in the Oruk Anam local government area of Akwa Ibom State, the southern region of Nigeria.

History  
Ekparakwa as well known, may be ranked as the most populated place in the region of Oruk Anam (Annang land).
The area is naturally rich with her resources and some major governmental fields including some populated companies, hospitals, bank branches, educational centres and major other adventures in the area. As a clan, Ekparakwa is made up of 14 villages as listed below:
1. Ika-Annang
2. Ikot Ntuen
3. Ediene Ikot Ebom
4. Mbon Ebre
5. Ukpom Edem Inyang
6. Ikot Akpasung
7. Ikot Akpaneda
8. Ekparakwa
9. Ikot Inyang
10. Ikot Akam
11. Ediene Atai
12. Itung Ndem
13. Ikot Eshiet
14. Ikot Mbong

The area serves as a major transit station for commuters. And also has a central coronial road leading through Ikot Ntuen and Ika-Annang to Asanga and Ikot Okoro and the other roads running through Ibagwa to Abak, and others include Ikot Abasi, Etinan  and Ukanafun local government areas of Akwa State, Nigeria.

References 

Towns in Oruk Anam
Populated places in Akwa Ibom State